The major intersections of the Pacific Highway in Australia, spread over  on the eastern seaboard of New South Wales, comprise a mix of freeway grade-separated conditions, suburban and urban roads.

Major intersections, from south to north include junctions with the Warringah Freeway, Lane Cove Tunnel, Gore Hill Freeway, Mona Vale Road / Ryde Road, Cumberland Highway, Pacific Motorway, Motorway Link, Central Coast Highway, Newcastle Inner City Bypass, New England Highway, Oxley Highway, Waterfall Way, Summerland Way, Gwydir Highway, Bruxner Highway, and the Pacific Motorway.

Major intersections

North Sydney to Wahroonga interchange, via A1

Wahroonga interchange to Hexham, via M1

Wahroonga interchange to Kariong interchange, via B83

Kariong interchange to Hexham, via A49/A43

Hunter River to Bellingen interchange, via A1

Bellingen interchange to Ballina interchange, via A1

Ballina interchange to Brunswick Heads interchange, via M1

Brunswick Heads interchange to Brisbane, via M1

See also

 Highways in Australia
 List of highways in New South Wales

References

External links

Major intersections
City of Lake Macquarie
Newcastle, New South Wales
Port Stephens Council
Roads in the Hunter Region
Highways in New South Wales
Highway 1 (Australia)